Praetorium was a fort in the Roman province of Dacia, located near Mehadia (Latin name Ad Mediam and/or Ad Medium), Romania.

See also
 List of castra

External links
 Roman castra from Romania - Google Maps / Earth

Notes

Roman legionary fortresses in Romania
History of Banat